Fred Strutt is an Australian former professional rugby league footballer who played in the New South Wales Rugby League (NSWRL) competition.

He played just the one match for the Dragons before joining the Eastern Suburbs club in 1963.

Strutt is recognized as Eastern Suburbs' 530th player. He played in 15 matches for the Roosters during the 1963 season.

References

Year of birth missing (living people)
Living people
Australian rugby league players
Sydney Roosters players
Rugby league locks
St. George Dragons players
Place of birth missing (living people)